John Brand (1790 – died 20 April 1856) was an English amateur cricketer.

He was mainly associated with Marylebone Cricket Club and he made 28 known appearances in first-class matches from 1815 to 1828.

References

1790 births
1856 deaths
English cricketers
English cricketers of 1787 to 1825
English cricketers of 1826 to 1863
Gentlemen cricketers
Marylebone Cricket Club cricketers
The Bs cricketers
Non-international England cricketers
E. H. Budd's XI cricketers
Marylebone Cricket Club First 9 with 3 Others cricketers
Marylebone Cricket Club First 8 with 3 Others cricketers